Sabroskyella is a genus of flies in the family Empididae.

Species
S. rancheria Wilder, 1982

References

Empidoidea genera
Empididae